What a Crazy World is a 1963 film directed by Michael Carreras from a script by Carreras and Alan Klein, from the latter's stage play. It is a pop musical featuring a number of late 1950s and early 1960s musical performers, including an appearance by Freddie and the Dreamers.

Premise
An unemployed working class lad, Alf Hitchens, has an on-off relationship with his girlfriend Marilyn, whilst trying to sell a song he has written. Michael Ripper appears in several cameo roles bemoaning the "bleeding kids" he encounters.

Cast 
Joe Brown – Alf Hitchens
Susan Maughan – Marilyn
Marty Wilde – Herbie Shadbolt
Harry H. Corbett – Sam Hitchens
Avis Bunnage – Mary Hitchens
Michael Ripper – The Common Man
Grazina Frame – Doris
Monte Landis – Solly Gold
Michael Goodman – Joey Hitchens
Jessie Robins – Fat Woman
Freddie and the Dreamers – Frantic Freddie and The Dreamers

On Network Video July 2014 with the original theatrical trailer.

Reception
Kinematograph Weekly called the film a "money maker" at the British box office for 1964.

References

External links
 

1963 films
1963 musical films
British musical films
Films directed by Michael Carreras
Films shot at Associated British Studios
1960s English-language films
1960s British films